Count  was a Japanese diplomat and politician. He became Minister of Foreign Affairs in 1890 and worked to revise unequal treaties. He served as plenipotentiary at the peace conference in Shimonoseki after the First Sino-Japanese War.

Early life
Mutsu Munemitsu was born in Wakayama domain, Kii Province as the sixth son of Date Munehiro, a samurai retainer of the Kii Tokugawa clan. His father was active in the Sonnō jōi movement, and Mutsu Munemitsu joined forces with Sakamoto Ryōma and Itō Hirobumi in the movement to overthrow the Tokugawa shogunate.

Meiji bureaucrat

After the Meiji Restoration, Mutsu held a number of posts in the new Meiji government, including that of governor of Hyōgo Prefecture and later governor of Kanagawa Prefecture, both of which were host to foreign settlements. He was head of the Land Tax Reform of 1873–1881, and served on the Genrōin. He conspired to assist Saigō Takamori in the Satsuma Rebellion and was imprisoned from 1878 until 1883. While in prison he translated Jeremy Bentham's Utilitarianism into Japanese.

After he left prison, he rejoined the government as an official of the Foreign Ministry, and in 1884 was sent to Europe for studies. Later he became Japanese Minister to Washington D.C. (1888–1890), during which time he established formal diplomatic relations between Japan and Mexico, and partially revised the unequal treaties between Japan and the United States.

On his return to Japan in 1890, he became Minister of Agriculture and Commerce. He was also elected to the House of Representatives of Japan from the 1st Wakayama District for a single term in the 1890 General Election. In 1892, he became Foreign Minister in the Itō Hirobumi cabinet. In 1894, he concluded the Anglo-Japanese Treaty of Commerce and Navigation of 1894, which finally ended the unequal treaty status between Japan and Great Britain.

Mutsu was the lead Japanese negotiator in the Treaty of Shimonoseki, which ended the First Sino-Japanese War (1894–1895).  In the wake of an attempt on the life of the Chinese leading negotiator Li Hongzhang by a Japanese fanatic, the Japanese government voluntarily reduced the size of the indemnity it planned to claim from China, and Mutsu famously remarked, 'Li's misfortune is the good fortune of the Great Ch'ing Empire'.  The Triple Intervention by France, Germany and Russia reversed the gains that Mutsu had negotiated from China in the Treaty of Shimonoseki, and the Japanese public blamed Mutsu for the national humiliation. He resigned all government posts in May 1896 and moved to Ōiso, Kanagawa, where he wrote his personal diplomatic memoirs Kenkenroku (蹇々録) after the treaty was signed to explain his views and actions. However, his memoirs could not be published until 1923 due to the diplomatic secrets they contained.

Mutsu lived in what is now Kyu-Furukawa Gardens. Mutsu died of tuberculosis in Takinogawa, Tokyo Prefecture in 1897.

Mutsu was ennobled with the title of hakushaku (count) under the kazoku peerage system at the end of the Sino-Japanese War.

Honors
 Grand Cordon of the Order of the Rising Sun (1895)
 Senior Second Rank (1897)

Family tree

Notes

References
 Cortazzi, Hugh. Britain & Japan: Biographical Portraits, Volume V. Global Oriental (2004) 
 Mutsu, Munemitsu. (1982). Kenkenroku (trans. Gordon Mark Berger). Tokyo: University of Tokyo Press. ; OCLC 252084846
 Perez, Louis. Japan Comes of Age: Mutsu Munemitsu and the Revision of the Unequal Treaties. Fairleigh Dickinson University Press (1999). 
 Perez, Louis. Mutsu Munemitsu and Identity Formation of the Individual and the State in Modern Japan. Edwin Mellen Press (2001).

Further reading

External links

 National Diet Library photos and biography

 
 

1844 births
1897 deaths
Meiji Restoration
Japanese diplomats
People from Wakayama (city)
Kazoku
People of the First Sino-Japanese War
19th-century deaths from tuberculosis
People of Meiji-period Japan
Tuberculosis deaths in Japan
Foreign ministers of Japan
Government ministers of Japan
Members of the House of Representatives (Empire of Japan)
Governors of Hyōgo Prefecture
Governors of Kanagawa Prefecture
Kansai University alumni